Tudor is a surname and given name of Welsh origin. It comes from the Brythonic Tudur, itself a derivation of Toutorīx which was conflated with Tewdwr or Tewdr. It is related to the name Theodore. 

The English royal dynasty, the House of Tudor (descended from the Welsh Tudors of Penmynydd) including prominent members:
Owen Tudor, lover or possibly second husband of Catherine of Valois, and grandfather of King Henry VII
Edmund Tudor, 1st Earl of Richmond, son of Owen Tudor and Catherine of Valois, father of King Henry VII
Jasper Tudor, 1st Duke of Bedford, second son of Owen and Catherine and brother of Edmund, uncle of King Henry VII
Arthur Tudor, eldest son of King Henry VII (predeceased his father)
Margaret Tudor, Queen Consort of Scotland, eldest daughter of King Henry VII. Mother of James V of Scots which gave rise to the House of Stuart in England.
Mary Tudor, Queen of France, latterly Mary Brandon, Duchess of Suffolk, second daughter of King Henry VII
Edmund Tudor, Duke of Somerset, third son of King Henry VII

Tudor, as a surname, may also refer to:
Adrian Tudor, a Romanian basketball player 
Alex Tudor, an English cricketer
Alexandru Tudor, a Romanian football referee
Antony Tudor, a British choreographer
Corneliu Vadim Tudor, a Romanian politician
Cristian Tudor, a Romanian footballer
David Tudor, an American pianist
Edward Tudor-Pole, a British singer
Fran Tudor, a Croatian football (soccer) player
Frank Tudor, an Australian politician
Frederic Tudor (1783–1864), an American entrepreneur known as Boston's "Ice King"
Henri Tudor, a Luxembourgian industrialist and inventor
Henry Hugh Tudor, a British soldier, later police chief in Ireland and then Palestine
Igor Tudor, a Croatian football (soccer) player
Joel Tudor, an American longboard surfer
John Tudor (footballer), an English football (soccer) player
John Tudor (baseball), an American baseball player
Larissa Tudor (d. 1926), a British woman who appeared strikingly similar to Grand Duchess Tatiana Nikolaevna of Russia but never actually claimed to be the former grand duchess. Many people who knew Larissa strongly suspected that she was the former grand duchess of Russia.
Luka Tudor (b. 1969), a Chilean football (soccer) player
Richard Tudor (born 1948), English cricketer
Robert Lee Tudor (1874–1949), American politician
Sandu Tudor, a Romanian poet and monk
Shane Tudor (b. 1982), an English football (soccer) player
Tasha Tudor (1915–2008), an American illustrator and author of children's books
William Tudor (1750–1819), an Attorney-at-Law who served as Representative of Boston in the Massachusetts General Court, State Senator, Secretary of the Commonwealth, and was a founder of the Massachusetts Historical Society 
William Tudor (1779–1830), a leading literary figure in Boston and cofounder of the North American Review and the Boston Athenaeum 
Will Tudor (b. 1987), an English actor

As a given name:
Tudor Arghezi (1880–1967), Romanian poet and writer, major Romanian literary figure 
Tudor Cataraga (1956–2010), Moldovan sculptor
Tudor Ciortea (1903–1982), Romanian composer
Tudor Dixon (born 1977), American politician
Tudor Evans, British politician
Tudor Ganea (1922–1971), Romanian mathematician
Tudor Gates (1930–2007), English screenwriter and trade unionist
Tudor Gheorghe (born 1945), Romanian musician
Tudor Gunasekara (1935–2021), Sri Lankan politician and diplomat
Paul Tudor Jones (born 1954), founder of the Tudor Investment Corporation hedge fund
Watkin Tudor Jones (born 1974), South-african rapper
Tudor Măinescu (1892–1977), Romanian poet and writer 
Tudor Mușatescu (1903–1970), Romanian playwright
Tudor Ratiu (born 1950), Romanian-American mathematician
Tudor Tănăsescu (1901–1961), Romanian engineer
Tudor Vladimirescu (c.1780–1821), Romanian revolutionary hero
Tudor Zbârnea (born 1955), Moldovan painter

See also
 Tudor (disambiguation)

References

Surnames of Welsh origin
Romanian masculine given names
Romanian-language surnames